Leucoptera auronivea is a moth in the family Lyonetiidae that is known from Saint Helena.

References

Leucoptera (moth)
Moths described in 1970
Moths of Africa